Rhopalomyia pomum, the sponge gall midge, is a species of gall midges, insects in the family Cecidomyiidae. The midges form leaf galls on Great Basin sagebrush (Artemisia tridentata).

References

Further reading

 
 

Cecidomyiinae
Articles created by Qbugbot
Insects described in 1975
Gall-inducing insects